Léon Herbo (8 October 1850, Templeuve - 19 June 1907, Ixelles) was a Belgian painter, best known for his portraits of women in casual poses and for his portraits of actors and actresses. He also painted genre scenes, many with Orientalist themes. His wife often served as his model.

Biography
He was ranked first in the preparatory competition for the Prix de Rome. He travelled throughout Germany, Italy and France before settling in Brussels.

The following year, he was one of the co-founders of "L'Essor", a progressive group that rebelled against the conservative teachings of the Academies.  

As well as exhibiting in Belgium, he participated in showings in Paris, at the Salon, in Munich and Berlin. He obtained honorable mention at the Exposition Universelle (1889). That same year, he and the animal painter, collaborated on creating a monumental canvas depicting the meeting of Queen Marie Henriette with the military squadron named after her.

He was very prolific and created numerous works for commercial use. Many were designed for reproduction by chromolithography, or the decoration of porcelain. Above all, he became the portrait painter at a fixed price and guaranteed likeness. "His reputation was such that he was often approached for portraits after death" (in Biographie Nationale publiée par l'Académie Royale des Sciences, des Lettres et des Beaux-Arts de Belgique (Tome 37 - pp. 432 & 433). A good example is the portrait of the Crown Prince of Belgium, Léopold Ferdinand, Count of Hainaut, who died in 1869, aged ten, a portrait he painted for Queen Marie-Henriette. Herbo had an important production as a portrait painter. We owe him more than a thousand portraits.

Most of his paintings are in private collections. Some may be seen at the Royal Museums of Fine Arts of Belgium, the Museum of Painting and Sculpture in Kortrijk, and the Musée des Beaux-Arts Tournai.

Selected paintings

Sources
 Biography @ the Dictionnaire des peintres belges
 Biographie Nationale de Belgique, Vol.37, pg.432-433 Online

External links

1850 births
1907 deaths
Belgian painters
Belgian portrait painters
Belgian orientalists
People from Nord (French department)